Bruvik may refer to:

Places
Bruvik (municipality), a former municipality in the old Hordaland county, Norway
Bruvik, Vestland, a village in Osterøy municipality, Vestland county, Norway
Bruvik Church, a church in Osterøy municipality, Vestland county, Norway

People
Olav Bruvik (1913–1962), Norwegian trade unionist and politician for the Labour Party
Trygve Bruvik (born 1952), Norwegian engineer and businessman